Masiu, officially the Municipality of Masiu (Maranao: Inged a Masiu), is a 5th class municipality in the province of Lanao del Sur, Philippines. According to the 2020 census, it has a population of 33,580 people.

History
The oldest name of Pangampong a Masiu was Maganding Daorogen a Maorintang Anonen (Zainun di komlaz see at Encarta map), given by Bataraan di kilaten, Darangen narrated that Rajah Indarapatra of Komara Mantapoli found Potre Raina laot at the cave of Masiu's river, Raina Laot and Indarapatra got married and bore the twins, now the darangen start sung from the twins,

Bataraan di kilaten is a noble of Bembaran, he was the son of Pazandalan a Morog, his brothers were, Dimaampao, Domalandalan, and Botawanen, the 4 brothers agreed to build their own kingdom in Kiaranda now "Ranaw" after the kingdom of Bembaran was totally destroyed, Dimaapao found "Marogong" now Unayan, Domalandalan settled in "Mimbisa" now Baloi, Botawanen stayed in "Dagodob" now Bayabao and Bataraan choose "Maganding" now eastern Masiu, 
Bataraan di Kilaten was married to Nomonao sa Ragiray, one of the 4 native princesses of Kiaranda a Ragat a tiongcop a layagen (Ranaw), the lovely couple settles in the area and name the place Maganding, now the people of the Pangampong a Masiu claimed descent from Bataraan di kilaten of Masiu (Zainun),
According to the Taritib (traditional order) of pangampong a Ranaw, Masiu is the Largest and most documented royal sultanate of Ranao, co-equal in royal power and prestige with the other principalities of Bayabao, Unayan, and Baloi, three sections (soko) on the east and west of lake Lanao, Poona Masiu, comprise the municipality of Masiu alone, Lumba a Masiu, comprises the lowland of Molondo, Taraka and Tamparan, the last section is the sedepan a Masiu (real maganding in sultan gumander) comprises the upland of Wato Balindong, Tugaya, Bacolod, Kalawi, and Madalum. These are the traditional Inged Township of settlements upon which "Municipalities" have been superimposed by the modern provincial government.
The Masiu Pangampong total territory is relatively smaller than either one of the territory of its sister principalities, but it is no less populous, fertile and productive with strategic advantages on the lake shorelines where the early Maranao ancestors founded and nourished their ancient civilization.

Taraka is the branch and source of the Pangampong a Masiu, the principal seat of power of the Sultan of Masiu is maintain by the royal houses Torogan of Maruhom Rahmatullah and Maruhom Dialaloddin (grandparents of Bae sa Macadar, Sultan Mardan, Sultan a Dimasangcay and Radia Muda sa Macadar) on the banks of the Taraka's river, These royal houses have the exclusive right to assume, the title of thrones of Sultan of Masiu and Cabugatan of Masiu as had been vested upon their family lines by the great ancestor Sarikran Balindong.

Maruhom Dialaloddin is the parents of Panimbang (former sultan of Talagian) begots Maco and Mengguel. Maco elder son of Sultan sa Talagian, "Panimbang" is a grandfathers of "Daporan" (Bae sa Macadar), Hadji Sulayman former "Diranggaren" (Sultan Mardan sa Macadar) grandfathers of Sultan sa Gandamatu, "Macaraub" Sultan a Dimasangcay sa Macadar, "Maningcal" Sultan a Radiamuda sa Macadar among Patka Apo sa Macadar the Children of Kalangit and his wife Bae sa Kalawaan of Unayan.

Geography
Masiu is located due south of Marawi and is considered to be the geographic center of mainland Mindanao, with the extreme points located in Surigao City (north), Jose Abad Santos, Davao Occidental (south), Caraga, Davao Oriental (east) and Zamboanga City (west) respectively.

Barangays
Masiu is politically subdivided into 35 barangays.

Climate

Demographics

Economy

References

External links
 Masiu Profile at the DTI Cities and Municipalities Competitive Index
 [ Philippine Standard Geographic Code]
 Philippine Census Information
 Local Governance Performance Management System

Municipalities of Lanao del Sur
Populated places on Lake Lanao